Kirchspielslandgemeinde Büsum was an Amt ("collective municipality"), located in the district of Dithmarschen, in Schleswig-Holstein, Germany. On 25 May 2008, it merged with the Amt Kirchspielslandgemeinde Wesselburen and the town Wesselburen to form the Amt Büsum-Wesselburen. It had its seat in Büsum and consisted of the following municipalities:

 Büsum (4.880)
 Büsumer Deichhausen (345)
 Hedwigenkoog (271)
 Oesterdeichstrich (273)
 Warwerort (284)
 Westerdeichstrich (908)

(Population on September 30, 2005)

Coat of arms
The coat of arms depicts Saint Clement, patron saint of sailors and fishermen and eponym of the Sankt Clemens church in Büsum.

Former Ämter in Schleswig-Holstein